Varvara Lepchenko was the defending champion, but lost in the second round to Kurumi Nara. 
Romina Oprandi won the title by defeating Alexa Glatch in the final 6–7(2–7), 6–3, 7–6(7–4).

Seeds

Main draw

Finals

Top half

Bottom half

References
 Main Draw
 Qualifying Draw

Lexus of Las Vegas Open - Singles
Party Rock Open
2011 Party Rock Open